The United Kingdom's  1902 State Landau is a horse-drawn carriage with a flexible leather roof which drops in two exact halves, back and front. 

It is a postilion landau, drawn by six horses under the control of three postilions, with no provision for a coachman. It is normally used with the top lowered, giving spectators a better view of passengers than provided by closed coaches and other vehicles; a closed coach is used if the weather is unsuitable, rather than raising the top.

Use
The 1902 State Landau is owned by the United Kingdom and set aside for the monarch's use within Britain. 

This carriage carries the monarch in processions at times of national celebration, and official reception of a visiting head of state. 

In the past, the monarch has provided the landau to carry the heir apparent and his bride after their marriage.

The largest and most splendid horse-drawn carriage—not coach—used by The Queen, it was built by Hooper in 1902 for the Coronation of Edward VII and Alexandra and given extra interior space.

Inclement weather
If rain threatens, the Irish State Coach replaces it. The 1762 Gold State Coach, sometimes referred to as the coronation coach, is the primary transport for high ceremonial events directly relating to the reigning monarch, but is reputed to be uncomfortable for passengers.

Contemporary description
This description was published in 1903 by Walter Gilbey, founder and chairman of the London Cart Horse Parade Society and president of the Royal Agricultural Society. 
... new State landau built by Messrs Hooper for King Edward VII and first used by him on the day of his coronation procession through London.

This magnificent example of the coachbuilders' art is over 18 feet long. The body is hung upon C springs by strong braces covered with ornamentally stitched morocco; each brace is joined with a massive gilt buckle with oak leaf and crown device. Between the hind springs is a rumble for two footmen; there is no driving seat as the carriage is intended to be drawn only by horses ridden postillion. The panels are painted in purple lake considerably brighter than is usual in order to secure greater effect; marking the contours of the body and the outlines of the rumble are mouldings in wood carved and gilt, the design being one of over-lapping oak leaves. 

The door panels, back and front panels, bear the Royal Arms with crown, supporters, mantle, motto, helmet and garter. On the lower quarter panel is the collar of the Order of the Garter, encircling its star and surmounted by the Tudor crown. Springing in a slow graceful curve from the under part of the body over the forecarriage is a "splasher" of crimson patent leather. Ornamental brass lamps are carried in brackets at each of the four corners of the body. 
 
As regards the interior of this beautiful carriage it is upholstered in crimson satin and laces which were woven in Spitalfields; the hood is lined with silk, as better adapted than satin for folding. The rumble is covered with crimson leather. It is to be observed that with the exception of the pine and mahogany used for the panels, English-grown wood and English-made materials only have been used throughout. 

While less ornate than the wonderful "gold coach" designed by Sir Wm Chambers and Cipriani in 1761, the new State landau, in its build, proportions, and adornment, is probably the most graceful and regal vehicle ever built.

See also
State Coach Other state coaches

References

External links

British monarchy
Royal carriages
Vehicles of the United Kingdom
Vehicles introduced in 1902